The 2011 Dublin Senior Football Championship is the inter club Gaelic football competition between the top teams in Dublin GAA. There are currently 8 teams remaining in contention for the Dublin Championship.

First round
The winners of the first round progressed to the second round, the losers went on to a backdoor round with a chance to progress to the second round.

Kilmacud Crokes progress to the next round.

Second round
The winners of the first-round games are tied together in a winners section of the second round. The losers of the winners section go on to the third round and the winners progress to the fourth round. The losers of the first round are tied in a losers section of the second round. The losers of the losers section go on to the relegation championship and the winners progress to the third round to play against the losers of the winners section.

Bye in 1st Round Losers Section = St Patricks (P), which leaves them safe from relegation

Third round
The third round comprises the losers of the winners section of the second round and also the winners of the losers section of the second round. Fingal Ravens, Ballinteer St Johns, St Annes, Erins Isle, Parnells, Trinity Gaels, Thomas Davis and Na Fianna will be taking part in the third round after losing their winners section clashes. St Brigids, O'Tooles, Lucan Sarsfields, St Vincents, Ballymun Kickhams, St Marys/Ballyboden St Enda's and Raheny will be taking part in the third round due to winning their second round losers section clashes. St Pats (P) got a bye to the third round. All third-round games will go into extra-time if the game is level at the end of sixty minutes. Trinity Gaels were knocked out at the third round, they will play their next championship game in the 2012 Championship.

Last Sixteen
The winners of the winners section of the second round qualify for this round, and will be paired against the winners of the third round fixtures. UCD, St Peregrines, Templeogue Synge Street, Kilmacud Crokes, St Oliver Plunketts, St Sylvesters, Round Towers (C), and St Maur's qualified for the last 16 by winning their second round winners section matches. St. Vincents, Thomas Davis, St. Brigid's, Ballymun Kickhams, Ballyboden St. Enda's, Parnells, O'Toole's and Lucan Sarsfields qualified by winning their third-round games. St. Maur's, O'Toole's, Kilmacud Crokes, Templeogue Synge Street, St. Peregrine's, UCD, St. Sylvester's and Round Towers, Clondalkin were knocked out during the fourth round, they will compete in the 2012 championship.

Quarter-finals
Ballymun Kickhams, Thomas Davis, St. Brigid's, Lucan Sarsfields, Ballyboden St. Enda's, Parnell's, St. Vincent's and St. Oliver Plunkett's/Eoghan Ruadh qualified for the quarter finals of the Dublin championship.

Semi-finals

Lucan Sarsfields, St. Brigid's, St. Oliver Plunkett's Eoghan Ruadh and Ballymun Kickhams qualified for the semi finals of the Dublin championship.

Dublin Senior Football Final

Relegation Championship
St Marks, Whitehall Colmcille, Naomh Mearnóg, Clontarf, St Judes and Fingallians contested the relegation championship due to losing their second round losers section games. Naomh Mearnóg and Clontarf won the first phase and therefore remained as senior championship teams for 2012. St. Jude's and Whitehall Colmcille won their respective second phase fixtures and also retained their senior status. The relegation final was contested by Fingallians and St. Mark's, with Fingallians being replaced in the senior championship by Dublin Intermediate Champions Skerries Harps.

The competition worked in the opposite way to a knockout competition. If you win, you are out and remain in the 2012 championship.

References

Dublin Senior Football Championship
Dublin Senior Football Championship